A Law Unto Herself is a 1918 American silent drama film directed by Wallace Worsley and starring Louise Glaum, Sam De Grasse and Joseph J. Dowling.

Cast
 Louise Glaum as 	Alouette DeLarme
 Sam De Grasse as Kurt Von Klassner 
 Joseph J. Dowling as 	LeSieur Juste DeLarme
 Edward Coxen as 	Bertrand Beaubien
 Irene Rich as Stephanie
 Elvira Weil as 	Fleurette D'Hermonville
 Roy Laidlaw as Fritz Von Klassner
 Burwell Hamrick as Bertrand Von Klassner at age 10
 George Hackathorne as 	Bertrand Von Klassner at age 20
 Peggy Schaffer as Bertha Von Klassner
 Jess Herring as Old Servant

References

Bibliography
 Connelly, Robert B. The Silents: Silent Feature Films, 1910-36, Volume 40, Issue 2. December Press, 1998.

External links
 

1918 films
1918 drama films
1910s English-language films
American silent feature films
Silent American drama films
American black-and-white films
Films directed by Wallace Worsley
Films distributed by W. W. Hodkinson Corporation
1910s American films